The Avia M 332 (originally known as the Walter M332) is an air-cooled four-cylinder inverted inline engine.  It was designed by Bohumil Šimůnek, of Motorlet Walter Aircraft Engines, as a more powerful replacement for the four-cylinder Walter Minor engine, going into production in 1958. Piston aircraft engine production was  transferred from Walter to Avia in 1964, the engine becoming the Avia M 332.

Applications
Aero 145
Carlson Criquet
Frontier MD-II
Fry Esprit VFII
Kharkov KhAI-24
Orličan L-40 Meta Sokol
Rolandas Kalinauskas RK-5 Ruth

Specifications

See also

References

External links
Moravia Inc

Aircraft air-cooled inline piston engines
1950s aircraft piston engines
Inverted aircraft piston engines
Walter aircraft engines
1958 introductions